A military funeral is a memorial or burial rite given by a country's military for a soldier, sailor, marine or airman who died in battle, a veteran, or other prominent military figures or heads of state. A military funeral may feature guards of honor, the firing of volley shots as a salute, drumming and other military elements, with a flag draping over the coffin.

Canada

Canadian military funerals involve many rituals seen in other parts of the world. The Royal Canadian Horse Artillery use a 25-pounder gun and limber as the funeral vehicle. Muffled drums accompany the graveside processional. The deceased's headdress, insignia and medals are borne on a velvet cushion into the funeral service. Volleys are fired over the grave when the body is interred. Countries in the Commonwealth duplicate the British military drill and ceremony. The Canadian funeral described above typifies the funerary service. The bugle tune Last Post is played as the body is interred.

Chile

In Chilean military funerals, due to its Prussian military tradition, the German song "Ich hatt' einen Kameraden" is sung in its Spanish version ("Yo tenía un camarada"). The casket may or may not be horse-drawn on a caisson. A bugler sounds the final honors during interment.

When the coffin enters the tomb, a fireteam executes a salvo. If for a general or flag officer, the 1st Artillery Regiment "Tacna" fires a three-volley gun salute.

Germany
In Germany, the coffin is covered by a "Bundesdienstflage"  (Federal service flag) the eagle facing to the right, looking to the head of the deceased.
At the level of the head of the deceased, a headdress (helmet, cap, mountain cap, beret), opening downwards, shield/edge pointing to the head of the coat of arms eagle is attached to the coffin.
Since, according to German ceremonial, the coffin is lowered into the grave enveloped in the flag, a second flag is carried separately for the purpose of handing it over to the family. 
Ludwig Uhland's song "Ich hatt' einen Kameraden" is an integral part of a military funeral. It is played when the coffin is lowered into the grave,
military personnel will perform a salute.

Indonesia

In Indonesia, military funerals are generally given only either towards retired personnel of the Indonesian National Armed Forces who served in domestic operations or in international peacekeeping operations or retired guerrillas and/or soldiers of the National Revolutionary War, especially those holding the "Bintang Gerilya (Star of the Guerrilla)" order, or to active personnel killed while on active duty service. Exceptional politicians and Ministers have the option for such a funeral, but most opt for a more intimate religious one. During the occasion of a State funeral, it is obligatory for a military funeral to be conducted, preceded by a final religious service before the funeral march begins. A Three-volley salute is the norm done by a squad seven soldiers occasionally a mixture of Armed Forces or Police personnel dependent on their career. The Honour drill team surrounding the burial site is a platoon-size or company formation and the larger the platoon or company, the more illustrious the departed. Prayers are led by representatives of the person's religious faith. Similar traditions also exist in the Indonesian National Police.

See here: Indonesian Military Funeral Video Sample

During the funeral ceremony, the presiding officer of the ceremony reads a message of remembrance in the name of the government and people of Indonesia, as well as his/her chosen uniformed organization in which he/she served, preceded by a reading of the person's life and achievements, as well as of his/her military/police service record (if any). The text is as follows:

Italy

In Italy the members of the Armed Forces who died in the line of duty are granted a state funeral by decree of the Prime Minister. So the funeral follows the protocol of a state funeral, and in particular the six officers in high uniform who carry the coffin are members of the same Armed Force of the departed.

Poland
In Poland, the last fragment of Władysław Tarnowski's song Śpij, kolego ("Sleep, friend"), a portion of the larger composition Jak to na wojence ładnie (the title has no precise English translation, but it is roughly "how nice it is in war", with a diminutive form conveying a sense of ironic solidarity) is an integral part of a military funeral, played by a trumpeter. It is also played during state ceremonies. Also part of it is a three volley salute (salwa honorowa) with the firing party consisting of an armed platoon or company.

Russia

In Russia, the people eligible for the military funerals are the distinguished veterans honorably discharged from service, servicemen killed in action or otherwise perished during their active service, state dignitaries and some other categories of people who distinguished themselves in state service. The ritual includes the honor guard, size of which depends on the deceased rank and status and may vary from merely a squad to a full company, which escorts the departed to the hearse and from the hearse to the grave, with a special detachment to carry the deceased's awards. A military marching band accompanies the funeral procession as well, traditionally playing the "How glorious is our Lord" (an old Royal anthem from XVIII century) as the body is put on the hearse and the National Anthem of Russia during the salute after the actual burial. On special occasions the garrison commander may authorise the use of a gun carriage (horse or motor drawn at his discretion) instead of a traditional motor hearse (a gun carriage in a Continental style is traditionally used in Russia instead of a caisson preferred in the Anglosphere). A deceased's portrait is carried before the procession, followed by the funerary wreaths and the awards, with the pallbearers following them. All military personnel presented are required to stand at attention as a flag-wrapped casket passes them. Aside from a flag, a land or air forces veteran is buried with his or her regulation cap on the casket, while naval officers are also entitled to their ceremonial dirk and its sheath to be crossed on a casket cover. Russian Orthodox clergy say a memorial player for the deceased serviceman or woman. At the burial ground, the eulogy is first read, the flag is lowered and the band plays the funerary march as the casket is lowered into the grave, after which a three-volley salute is fired with blank rounds, followed by the performance of the national anthem by the band. An artillery gun salute may be authorised for a particularly important funeral for a general or flag officer.

Spain

In Spain, the  formed troops sing "La muerte no es el final": Death is not the End during funeral ceremonies and in all military ceremonies, when the fallen are being honored. The Spanish Legion has an exception: the regimental hymn Novio de la Muerte (Bridegroom of Death) is played in full instead during occasions that the Legion attends.

United Kingdom

The British Army carries reversed arms at military funerals. The Last Post and Rouse or Reveille are sounded at the appropriate moment during the rite.

United States

In the United States, the United States Army Military District of Washington (MDW) is responsible for providing military funerals. "Honoring Those Who Served" is the title of the program for instituting a dignified military funeral with full honors to the nation's veterans.

As of January 1, 2000, Section 578 of Public Law 106-65 of the National Defense Authorization Act mandates that the United States Armed Forces shall provide the rendering of honors in a military funeral for any eligible veteran if requested by his or her family. As mandated by federal law, an honor guard detail for the burial of an eligible veteran shall consist of no fewer than two members of the Armed Forces. One member of the detail shall be a representative of the parent armed service of the deceased veteran. The honor guard detail will, at a minimum, perform a ceremony that includes the folding and presenting of the flag of the United States to the next of kin and the playing of "Taps", which will be played by a lone bugler, if available, or by audio recording.  Today, there are so few buglers available that the United States Armed Forces often cannot provide one. However, federal law allows Reserve and National Guard units to assist with funeral honors duty when necessary. On the day of the burial or interment, the U.S. Flag is lowered to half-staff.

Other
 After the 2006 Lebanon war and during the Syrian civil war, Hezbollah draped coffins containing their dead in Hezbollah flags with flowers on top. They were given a funeral according to Shiite Muslim traditions, then buried in their hometowns.
 Irish Republican Army members have been accorded military funerals.
 On occasion, deceased soldiers have been accorded military funerals by their enemies (for example, see Manfred von Richthofen).

Gallery

See also
Military awards and decorations
Military rites
Burial at sea
State funeral

References

Further reading

Images and sounds
Sample of "Taps" (.wav)

Military life
Military traditions
State ritual and ceremonies
Funerals